Verschueren is a Dutch-language toponymic surname common in Belgium. The name is a contraction of van der schueren, meaning "from the barn(s)". Forms more common in the Netherlands are Verschuren and Verschuur.  Notable people with the surname include:

Adolph Verschueren (1922–2004), Belgian racing cyclist
Arno Verschueren (born 1997), Belgian football defender
Denis Verschueren (1897–1954), Belgian racing cyclist
 (1928–1995), Belgian jazz musician and composer
Femke Verschueren (born 2000), Belgian singer
Frans Verschueren (born 1962), Belgian racing cyclist
Jolien Verschueren (1990–2021), Belgian cyclo-cross cyclist
Lisa Verschueren (born 1995), Belgian artistic gymnast
Marcel Verschueren (1928–2008), Belgian racing cyclist
Michel Verschueren (1931–2022), Belgian football manager
Patrick Verschueren (born 1962), Belgian racing cyclist
Sidonie Verschueren (fl. 1928), Belgian sprinter
Theo Verschueren (born 1962), Belgian racing cyclist
Victor Verschueren (1893–?), Belgian bobsledder and ice hockey player

See also
Verschuere
, Dutch organ builders

References

Dutch-language surnames
Surnames of Belgian origin
Toponymic surnames